Entoloma myrmecophilum  is a species of fungus in the Entolomataceae family. It is found across Europe. It was described by Henri Romagnesi in 1978 as  Rhodophyllus myrmecophilus, before being changed to its current name as the consensus has been to use the genus name Entoloma rather than Rhodophyllus.

References

External links

Entolomataceae
Fungi of Europe
Fungi described in 1978